The North Dakota District is one of the 35 districts of the Lutheran Church–Missouri Synod (LCMS), and consists of congregations throughout the state of North Dakota as well as including one congregation in South Dakota. The North Dakota District includes approximately 88 congregations, subdivided into 6 circuits, as well as 1 preschool and 4 elementary schools. Baptized membership in district congregations is approximately 22,000.

The North Dakota District was formed in 1945 when the North Dakota and Montana District was divided, also creating the Montana District. District offices are located in Fargo, North Dakota and Bismarck, North Dakota. Delegates from each congregation meet in convention every three years to elect the district president, vice presidents, circuit counselors, a board of directors, and other officers. Rev. Arie Bertsch was elected district president in 2017.

Presidents
Rev. Arnold Henry Grumm, 1945–50
Rev. Walter Henry Theodore Cordts, 1950–54
Rev. Bernhard G. Mueller, 1954–57
Rev. Lothar Karl Meyer, 1957–61
Rev. Harold V. Huber, 1961–65
Rev. John D. Fritz, 1965–67
Rev. Alwin M. Reimnitz, 1967–91
Rev. Norman C. Sincebaugh, 1991–2000
Rev. Larry S. Harvala, 2000–2008
Rev. Patrick O'Brien, 2008–2009
Rev. James Baneck, 2009–2016
Rev. Arie Bertsch, 2017- present

References

External links
North Dakota District web site
LCMS: North Dakota District
LCMS Congregation Directory
Synodal-Bericht des Minnesota und Dakota Distrikts der Deutschen Evang.-Luth. Synode von Missouri, Ohio und Andern Staaten (1882–1889)
Synodal-Bericht des Minnesota und Dakota Distrikts der Deutschen Evang.-Luth. Synode von Missouri, Ohio und Andern Staaten (1891–1910)

Lutheran Church–Missouri Synod districts
Lutheranism in North Dakota
Lutheranism in South Dakota
Christian organizations established in 1945